Zlatko Horvat (born 25 September 1984) is a Croatian handball player for Dabas KK and the Croatia national team.

Career
Since 2003 Horvat's Zagreb has not lost a match in the domestic league and cup. Horvat has reached the quarter final of the EHF Champions League in 2002–03, 2003–04, 2008–09, 2011–12, 2014–15 and 2015–16.
In 2013 Zagreb had won the SEHA League.

He represented his country at the European Championships in 2006 and 2008 as well as the 2009 World Championship, winning two silver medals with the team. He also played for Croatia at the 2008 Summer Olympics in Beijing, China and the 2012 Summer Olympics where Croatia won bronze.

Honours
Zagreb
Dukat Premier League
Winner: 2002–03, 2003–04, 2004–05, 2005–06, 2006–07, 2007–08, 2008–09, 2009–10, 2010–11, 2011–12, 2012–13, 2013–14, 2014–15, 2015–16, 2016–17
Croatian Cup
Winner: 2003, 2004, 2005, 2006, 2007, 2008, 2009, 2010, 2011, 2012, 2013, 2014, 2015, 2016, 2017
SEHA League:
Winner: 2012–13
Third place: 2011–12, 2013–14, 2014–15, 2015–16
EHF Cup Winners' Cup
Finalist: 2005

Individual
Most 7m goals in 2013–14 SEHA League — 35 goals

References

External links

1984 births
Living people
Handball players from Zagreb
Croatian male handball players
Olympic handball players of Croatia
Handball players at the 2008 Summer Olympics
Handball players at the 2012 Summer Olympics
Handball players at the 2016 Summer Olympics
RK Zagreb players
Olympic bronze medalists for Croatia
Olympic medalists in handball
Medalists at the 2012 Summer Olympics
Mediterranean Games silver medalists for Croatia
Competitors at the 2005 Mediterranean Games
Mediterranean Games medalists in handball
21st-century Croatian people